The Berman Jewish Policy Archive (BJPA), housed at the Graduate School of Education at Stanford University is a centralized electronic database of Jewish communal policy research. Its collection contains more than 20,000 documents, with holdings spanning from 1900 until today. It also is connected to the Jewish Survey Question Bank, a freely available repository of survey tools and questionnaires. The BJPA partners with the North American Jewish Data Bank; together they source the largest publicly available collection of Jewish policy research. The BJPA was established through the Mandell L. and Madeleine H. Berman Foundation, the Charles H. Revson Foundation, and continued with support from the Jim Joseph Foundation.

The director and founder is Steven M. Cohen.

The associate director is Ari Y. Kelman

References

External links 
 
 BJPA on OpenDOAR

Jewish society
New York University
Online archives of the United States
Jews and Judaism in the United States
Social sciences literature
Sociology of religion
Jewish archives